The 1936 United States presidential election in Wyoming took place on November 3, 1936, as part of the 1936 United States presidential election. State voters chose three representatives, or electors, to the Electoral College, who voted for president and vice president.

Wyoming was won by the Democratic candidate, incumbent President Franklin D. Roosevelt, running with John Nance Garner, who was the 39th and incumbent Speaker of the United States House of Representatives, with 60.58 percent of the popular vote, against the Republican candidate, Alf Landon, who was the Governor of Kansas, running with future Secretary of the Navy Frank Knox, with 37.47 percent of the popular vote. Despite Landon losing by over 23 percent, Wyoming was nonetheless his strongest state West of the Great Plains and voted overall 0.93 percent more Republican than the nation at large, perhaps a sign of the strong Republican state it would become in future elections. Roosevelt won Wyoming by 23 points, outperforming his victory in 1932 by 8 points. 

, this is the best ever performance by a Democratic presidential nominee in Wyoming, and the last election in which a Democrat has carried the following counties: Campbell, Converse, Niobrara, Sublette, Washakie and Weston, as even Lyndon B. Johnson failed to carry them when he won Wyoming by 13 points against Republican Barry Goldwater in 1964.

Roosevelt flipped Big Horn County, which had narrowly backed Herbert Hoover in 1932, winning it by a landslide margin of 22 points, just slightly worse than his statewide margin. Despite losing by more than Hoover, Landon flipped Crook and Johnson counties, both of which had narrowly backed Roosevelt in 1932. This would mark the beginning of a streak of Republican victories in these two counties, as no Democrat has carried them on the Presidential level since. Big Horn County would not vote for a Democratic Presidential candidate again until it narrowly backed Johnson over Goldwater in 1964, and no Democrat has won it since. This would be the last time any candidate won Wyoming by double digits until Republican Dwight Eisenhower in 1952, and the last for a Democrat until 1964.

Roosevelt's victory was a reflection of a nationwide reconsolidation for the Democratic Party that took place throughout the 1930s, as Republicans were seen as out of touch with the middle class, instead serving big businesses, while Democratic policies such as The New Deal were popular with voters attributed to easing The Great Depression. 4 years earlier, Democrats had flipped the governorship, and in the 1934 midterms, Democrats flipped the Secretary of State, Auditor, Treasurer, and Superintendent Of Public Instruction offices. Along with Roosevelt's landslide reelection in the state, Democrat Harry Schwartz defeated incumbent Republican Senator Robert D. Carey in the concurrent Senate race, thus giving Democrats full control of all statewide offices.

Results

Results by county

See also
 United States presidential elections in Wyoming

References

Wyoming
1936
1936 Wyoming elections